Moiben is a constituency in Kenya, one of six constituencies in Uasin Gishu County.
Moiben Constituency is divided into the following Wards:
 Moiben Ward
 Sergoit Ward
 Kimumu Ward
 Tembelio Ward
 Karuna/Meibeki Ward

References 

Constituencies in Uasin Gishu County